During the 1993–94 English football season, Arsenal F.C. competed in the FA Premier League.

Season summary

1993–94 saw a great deal of change at Arsenal. The season began with the club's longest-serving player, 34-year-old defender David O'Leary, signing for Leeds and out-of-favour defender Colin Pates joining Brighton. Irish winger Eddie McGoldrick was captured from Crystal Palace; his arrival led to the sale of fellow winger Anders Limpar to Everton in March 1994.

Arsenal conquered their goalscoring problems which had restricted them to 10th place a year earlier. This time round they finished fourth in the league, and at one stage looked like the most likely team to threaten Manchester United's lead. But the real success of the campaign was a 1–0 win over Parma in Copenhagen which gave them glory in the European Cup Winners' Cup and their first European trophy since 1970.

Arsenal surrendered their defence of both domestic cup competitions. Their progress in the League Cup was haltered in November, when they surrendered the trophy to an Aston Villa side who went on to win it. The defeat brought to an end a 25-match unbeaten cup run for Arsenal. They also lost their defence of the FA Cup to Bolton Wanderers in February.

The close season saw Arsenal make swoops for Swedish midfielder Stefan Schwarz as manager George Graham prepared to maintain an Arsenal side that could challenge on all fronts the following season.

Players

Appearances and goals

|}
[R] – Reserve team player
[L] – Out on loan
[S] – Sold

Results

Premier League

Standings

Results summary

Matches

European Cup Winners' Cup

It all began on a wet night in Odense. Tony Adams was suspended and Arsenal's Cup Winners Cup hopes nearly died before they’d started. The danes scored first then they missed a penalty. Arsenal pulled themselves together and Ian Wright equalised. Paul Merson broke away to hit the winner. 

Kim Brinks team made it difficult for The Gunners in the second leg. They even equalised Kevin Campbells header. Arsenals relief at hearing the final whistle was obvious. In those final moments several players and thousands of fans had relived the horror of the European Cup defeat by Benfica two seasons earlier. But Arsenal eased through to the second round.

Ian Wright tore Standard Liège apart at Highbury. Merson scored a brilliant free-kick. The Standard manager, Arie Haan, was sacked a few days later. So was his replacement, Rene van der Eycken, after Arsenal slaughtered Standard 7-0 in Liège.

Torino in the quarter final posed some tougher questions. George Graham won the tactical battle in Turin, stationing David Hillier in front of Adams and Steve Bould to stop Enzo Francescoli breaking from midfield. Arsenal created most of the chances. At Highbury Paul Davis's perfectly flighted 66th minute free kick found Adams at the far post, and Adams headed the only goal of the game.

French League leaders Paris Saint-Germain were shocked when the Gunners took command at the Parc des Princes. The goalkeeper Bernard Lama was PSG's hero. Wright beat him once to head Arsenal in front. And PSG punished rare slackness on the Gunners near post at a corner, when David Ginola sneaked in to head the equaliser. Valdo, the Brazilian buzzed in midfield at Highbury. Adams was remarkable; organising, calming, dashing in with fast ditch tackles. The French threatened, but Seaman was rarely troubled. Campbells sixth minute header from Lee Dixon's cross proved decisive.

Typically, Arsenal won their first European trophy since 1970, the hard way: with Ian Wright suspended; John Jensen, Martin Keown and David Hillier injured. There were times when Arsenal rode their luck. Steve Bould had to launch a last ditch tackle on Faustino Asprilla in the opening seconds. Tomas Brolin hit the upright post in the 14th minute. Five minutes later Arsenal made the vital break through with a goal worthy of winning a final. Alan Smith pouncing on Lorenzo Minottis misdirected clearance then cracking a left footed 20 yarder past Luca Bucci, off a post. It was a great night for Smith, he's never played better than he did in Copenhagen, held the ball up tirelessly up front and frustrated Parma. It was a great night for George Graham, enjoying European success as a manager to add to his Fair Cup winners medal 24 years ago. Steve Bould won the Man of the Match plaudits and, given their injury problems, it had been a remarkable game for the Gunners. Nevio Scala, the Parma manager, also praised Arsenal: "Tactically and technically we did not function because Arsenal were a better team."

First round

Second round

Quarter-finals

Semi-finals

Final

FA Cup
Arsenal visited George Grahams old club Millwall in the first round. Tony Adams won the game when he headed home a corner as Paul Merson challanged Kasey Keller. 

Bolton had knocked out Liverpool in 1993 and beat Everton in the 1994 third round replay. Jason McAteer escaped from man-marking Martin Keown who collided with Steve Bould to fire Wanderers ahead. That brought Arsenal to life. Early in the second half, Ian Wright levelled from Mersons shot, and Adams headed a second from a free-kick. Bolton however stepped up another gear. Under continual pressure the Gunners finally cracked,  when Owen Coyle netted Boltons equaliser, only five minutes from the final whistle. 

The replay at Highbury took a turn after 20 minutes. Phil Brown lofted an overhead kick into the Arsenal box. The Gunners defence pressed out and John McGinlay ran on to head past David Seamans outstreched hand. Alan Smith levelled the scores, after Ian Wright had challanged Aidan Davison for Lee Dixons throw in. The game thundered into extra-time and after 103 minutes Nigel Winterburn stubbed a back pass. Coyles shot hit the post and McAteer buried the rebound. Five minutes from the end substitute striker Andy Walker was put clear and drove home the third to end any doubts about the outcome. Bruce Riochs side ended Arsenals hopes of retaining the trophy.

League Cup

First-team squad
Squad at end of season

Left club during season

Reserve squad

References 

Arsenal F.C. seasons
Ars
UEFA Cup Winners' Cup-winning seasons